See also Ferrari 365 GT4 2+2 & Ferrari 365 GTC/4 for later 2+2 models, and Ferrari Daytona for the 365 GTB/4 & GTS/4

The Ferrari 365 was Ferrari's large front-engine, rear-wheel-drive 2- and 2+2-seater grand tourer line. Introduced at the 1966 Geneva Motor Show, it replaced the 330 and 500 Superfast.

365 California

The 365 California replaced the 500 Superfast for 1966. It was the first 365 model, with its 4.4 L (4390 cc/267 in³) V12 based on the 330's 4.0 L Colombo unit but with an 81 mm bore. This later version of the Colombo engine was rated at 320 horsepower, in street tune using three Weber carburettors.

The 365 California used the same chassis as the 500 Superfast but with an evolutionary cabriolet body by Pininfarina. Debuting at the Geneva Motor Show in 1966, just 14 examples were produced  (including 2 in right hand drive) before production ended in 1967. Whilst the prototype was built on a 330 GT 2+2 type 571 chassis, production cars featured type 598 chassis. Chassis' were sent to Pininfarina's Grugliasco plant to be bodied and trimmed which were later returned to Ferrari to finish their mechanical components. 

On 28 June 2005, a pristine 365 California sold for €736,000 (US$890,000).

365 GT 2+2

The most popular 365 model was 1967's 365 GT 2+2, replacing the 330 GT 2+2. Unlike the 330 GT 2+2 car it replaced, which had a live rear axle on leaf springs, the 365 GT 2+2 had independent rear suspension.

The 365 GT 2+2 was a luxurious car with leather seats, power steering and brakes, electric windows, and optional air conditioning. It quickly became the company's top-selling model with about 800 produced in four years, 52 of which were right hand drive. When leaving the factory the 365 GT 2+2 was fitted with Pirelli Cinturato 205VR15 tyres (CN72).

365 GTC and GTS

The 330 GTC and GTS were replaced in 1968 by the 365 GTC and GTS. It was essentially a re-engine of the 330 GTC/GTS, with the engine increasing from 4.0 liters and 300 horsepower to 4.4 liters and 320 horsepower. The styling remained almost unchanged: on both body styles differences were limited to vents moved from behind the front wheels to the bonnet.

Like all 365s, the GTC and GTS were powered by a 4,390 cc Colombo V12 engine, specifically its Tipo 245/C variant. Fed by three twin-choke Weber 40 DFI carburettors, it produced  at 6,600 rpm.
Integrating the gearbox with the final drive gave these cars a balanced 50:50 weight distribution. The 365 GTC and GTS retained the independent rear suspension, employing coil springs and wishbones, of its immediate predecessor. Brakes were servo-assisted discs all-round with a split circuit system.

168 examples of the coupé were built (including 22 in right hand drive) between the 1968 and 1970. It was replaced by the Ferrari 365 GTC/4. Just 20 spiders were built before its place was assumed by the 365 GTB/4-based Daytona Spider.

References 

365
Grand tourers
Cars introduced in 1966
Group 4 (racing) cars
2+2 coupés
1970s cars